William Kinsella is the name of:

W. P. Kinsella (1935–2016), Canadian novelist
William T. Kinsella, American submarine commander in World War Two
William Kinsella (bishop), a Catholic bishop